Robert Burrow King (June 3, 1913 – June 19, 1994) was an American football coach. He served as the head football coach at Furman University from 1958 to 1972. He had previously been an assistant football coach for ends at the University of Illinois for 11 years. He is a member of the South Carolina Athletic Hall of Fame and was Southern Conference Media Coach of the Year in 1970. He graduated from Furman in 1937 where he played on the football team. He was succeeded by Art Baker as Furman head coach in 1973.

Head coaching record

References

1913 births
1994 deaths
American football ends
Furman Paladins football coaches
Furman Paladins football players
Illinois Fighting Illini football coaches